Tiina Ala-aho is a paralympic athlete from Finland competing mainly in category F33 shot put and javelin events.

Tiina first competed in the 2000 Summer Paralympics where she won the gold medal in the F33-34 shot put. Four years later in the expanded F32-34/52/53 shot put she failed to medal but she did win a bronze in the F33/34/52/53 javelin. She then competed in the javelin again at the 2008 Summer Paralympics but failed to medal.

References

Paralympic athletes of Finland
Athletes (track and field) at the 2000 Summer Paralympics
Athletes (track and field) at the 2004 Summer Paralympics
Athletes (track and field) at the 2008 Summer Paralympics
Paralympic gold medalists for Finland
Paralympic bronze medalists for Finland
Living people
Finnish female javelin throwers
Finnish female shot putters
World record holders in Paralympic athletics
Medalists at the 2000 Summer Paralympics
Medalists at the 2004 Summer Paralympics
Year of birth missing (living people)
Paralympic medalists in athletics (track and field)
20th-century Finnish people
21st-century Finnish people